Avtar is a given name. Notable people with this name include:

Avtar Singh Atwal, Deputy Inspector General of Police in Punjab Police
Avtar Singh Bhadana (born 1957), member of the 14th Lok Sabha of India
Avtar Singh Cheema (1933–1989), the first Indian to lead a successful expedition that climbed Mount Everest
Avtar Gill, Indian Television and film actor
Avtar Gill (darts player), Canadian darts player
Avtar Singh Kang, Punjabi singer and Punjabi Folk contributor
Avtar Singh Karimpuri, Indian politician of the Bahujan Samaj Party (BSP)
Avtar Lit, the owner and chairman of Sunrise Radio Group
Avtar Singh Malhotra (1917–2005), Punjabi politician belonging to the Communist Party of India
Avtar Singh Paintal M.D. Ph.D. (1925–2004), medical scientist who made pioneering discoveries
Avtar Singh Rikhy (born 1923), former Secretary-General of Lower House of Parliament of India
Avtar Saini, microprocessor designer and developer
Avtar Singh Sandhu (1950–1988), poet of the Naxalite movement in the Punjabi literature of the 1970s
Avtar Singh (judoka) (born 1992), Indian judoka at the 2016 Summer Olympics in Brazil
Avtar Singh (politician), Indian politician, member of the Sixth Legislative Assembly of Delhi of India

See also
Aaj Ka M.L.A. Ram Avtar, 1984 film starring Rajesh Khanna in the lead role
Chaubis Avtar, meaning Twenty Four Incarnations, a composition in Dasam Granth containing history of 24 incarnations of Vishnu
Paranath Avtar, composition, within Rudra Avtar, written by Guru Gobind Singh
Ram Avtar, character actor turned comedian in Hindi cinema
Rudra Avtar, composition and epic poetry written by Guru Gobind Singh, present in Dasam Granth Sahib
Ram-Avtar, 1988 movie starting Sunny Deol, Anil Kapoor, Sridevi and Shakti Kapoor
Avatar
Avtaar, 1983 film starring Rajesh Khanna in the lead role